Gymnopilus lutescens is a species of mushroom-forming fungus in the family Hymenogastraceae.

Description

Habitat and distribution
Gymnopilus lutescens grows on hardwood. It has been collected in Michigan, in July.

See also

List of Gymnopilus species

References

lutescens
Fungi of North America
Fungi described in 1969
Taxa named by Lexemuel Ray Hesler